{|

{{Infobox ship career
|Hide header=
|Ship country=Peru
|Ship flag=
|Ship name=
|Ship namesake=
|Ship owner=
|Ship operator=
|Ship registry=
|Ship route=
|Ship ordered=
|Ship awarded=
|Ship builder=Servicio Industrial de Marina--Sima<ref name=Janes1992>Jane's Fighting Ships 1992-1993</ref>
|Ship original cost=
|Ship yard number=
|Ship way number=
|Ship laid down=
|Ship launched=15 July 1970
|Ship sponsor=
|Ship christened=
|Ship completed=
|Ship acquired=
|Ship commissioned=25 May 1972
|Ship recommissioned=
|Ship decommissioned=
|Ship maiden voyage= 
|Ship in service=
|Ship out of service= December 2014
|Ship renamed=
|Ship reclassified=
|Ship refit=
|Ship struck=
|Ship reinstated=
|Ship homeport=Callao
|Ship identification=
|Ship motto=
|Ship nickname=
|Ship honours=
|Ship honors=
|Ship captured=
|Ship fate=Towed to be scrapped in Ecuador
|Ship notes=
|Ship badge=
}}

|}
The Peruvian Navy Ship BAP Mollendo (ATC 131) is a vessel for transportation and logistics. With 18.400 tons displacement and 154 meters in length, was built in the shipyards of the Industrial Service of the Navy of Peru (PERU-SIMA) in El Callao. Was released on July 15, 1970 and commissioned to the Navy May 25, 1972. She was originally named Ilo, and had a sister Rimac''.  Her present name is after the town of Mollendo in southern Peru.

she operated as part of 2nd Surface Flotilla. She is prepared to transport vehicles, military personnel and material in logistic support operations.

In 2002, the Mollendo underwent several amendments and fittings to be used as a training ship of the Navy Instruction and has been making trips abroad Instruction Cadets Second and Fourth Year of the Naval School of Peru, visiting many ports of the world

Footnotes

Auxiliary ships of the Peruvian Navy
1970 ships
Ships built in Peru